The Car de Luxe was an American automobile manufactured from 1906 until 1910.  A sister marque to the Queen, the Car de Luxe had overhead valves which were operated by one rocker per cylinder.  The 40/50 hp, 6755 cc car was actuated by a "push-pull" rod and an unusual back axle; the load was further taken by an I-beam dead axle which carried a separate differential unit.

References
David Burgess Wise, The New Illustrated Encyclopedia of Automobiles.

Defunct motor vehicle manufacturers of the United States